The Vancouver Tenants Union is a non-governmental organisation advocating for tenants' rights and defending tenants' interests in British Columbia, Canada. It represents more than 2,000 members across British Columbia, and seeks to build a strong base of tenants throughout the province to establish political power and create positive change for local residents.

History 

On September 7, 2018, the government announced that, based on the consumer price index and the formula used for rent increases, the maximum annual allowable rent increase for 2019 would be 4.5 per cent. VTU members and renters attended a standing-room-only VTU General Meeting on September the 8th, ready to mobilize and dispute the rent increase as rising rents had outpace wages and inflation since the start of the Vancouver housing crisis.

On September 13 The Vancouver Tenants Union held a housing rally outside the downtown Vancouver office of Landlord BC - a lobby group arguing in favor of the automatic annual increases.

As a result of tenants mobilization and organization throughout British Columbia, the provincial government reduced the maximum allowable rent increase from 4.5% to 2.5%.

References

External links 
 Official website

Non-profit organizations based in Vancouver
Housing organizations
Politics of Vancouver